Nakamh-Riangsuanneic  is a 2021 Indian Rongmei language film directed by Kachangthai Gonmei and produced by Hornbill Entertainment Production. The film stars Kachangthai Gonmei and Achingna Kamei in the lead role and premiered at International Folklore film festival in Payyanur, India. It was one of the only 2 films from Manipur to receive Central Board of Film Certification in the year 2020.

Premise
The film is based on the folklore of the Rongmei Naga community in Northeast India, tells the story of an orphan named Nikamh who falls in love with Riangsuanneic, daughter of a rich man in Makuilongdi village.

Cast
 Kachangthai Gonmei
 Achingna Kamei 
 Lambi Rongmei 
 Ahiambung

Production
The movie was shot in Tamenglong district of Manipur and Cachar district of Assam.

Release
The film was released officially in the year 2021 and has been screened regularly across India.

Accolades

References

Naga films
Films set in Assam
Films shot in Assam
2021 films
Cinema of Manipur